The peerage title Earl of Ormond and the related titles Duke of Ormonde and Marquess of Ormonde have a long and complex history. An earldom of Ormond has been created three times in the Peerage of Ireland.

History of Ormonde titles
The earldom of Ormond was originally created in 1328 for James Butler. For many subsequent years, the earls took significant roles in the government of Ireland, and kept a tradition of loyalty to the English crown and to English custom. Several of the earls also had reputations as scholars. The fifth earl was created Earl of Wiltshire (1449) in the Peerage of England, but he was attainted in 1461 and his peerages were declared forfeit.  The earldom of Ormond was restored to his younger brother, John Butler, the sixth earl, in 1476. Thomas, the 7th earl, died without issue in 1515; the de facto, if not indeed the de jure earl, Piers Butler, a cousin of the 7th Earl, was induced to resign his rights to the title in 1528. This facilitated the next creation by awarding the titles of Ormond and Wiltshire to Thomas Boleyn, who was the father of Anne Boleyn. At that time, Anne was the mistress of King Henry VIII of England. As a maternal grandson of the 7th Earl, Thomas Boleyn had a slim claim to the title.  Through his daughter, Anne, he was the grandfather of Elizabeth I of England. On the death of Boleyn, these peerages of the second creation became extinct because he lacked male heirs, his son George having been executed for treason.

As a reward for his patriotism and generosity, Piers Butler was created Earl of Ossory five days after resigning his rights to the other titles. The third creation for Piers Butler (in 1538) merely recognised the reality of the situation prior to the Boleyn irruption, and in 1544 an act of parliament confirmed him in the possession of his earldom, which was declared to be the creation of 1328, and not the new creation of 1538. James Butler, the fifth earl of this creation, was made Marquess of Ormonde (1642) and Duke of Ormonde (1660) in the Peerage of Ireland, and Duke of Ormonde (1682) in the Peerage of England. Through his marriage with his cousin Elizabeth Preston, granddaughter of the third earl, he had reunited the titles with the Ormonde estates. After 1682, the spelling "Ormonde" was used almost universally.

Other titles held by the earls
Prior to the creation of the Earldom of Ormond, the First Earl's father had been created the first Earl of Carrick. However, this title did not pass to James Butler. After a gap of 7 years following his father's death, James, who had recently married Eleanor de Bohun (a granddaughter of Edward I) was rewarded with an earldom in his own right – Ormond.

The 2nd Earl of Ormand was known widely as the Earl of Gowran (1385), a customary title. A later peerage title, the Earldom of Gowran, was granted to the seventh son of the 1st Duke of Ormond in 1676 but became extinct within less than two years.  A subsidiary barony title - Baron Gowran - was held by the FitzGeralds, Earls of Upper Ossory, between 1715-1818.

Subsidiary titles for the dukes were Earl of Brecknock (1660) and Baron Butler (1660) in the Peerage of England and Earl of Ormond (1328), Earl of Ossory (1538) and Viscount Thurles (1536) in the Peerage of Ireland. In 1715, the second duke was attainted and his English peerages declared forfeit. In 1758 the de jure third duke (Irish) died and the dukedom and marquessate became extinct. Walter, the eleventh earl, was given an English peerage as Lord Butler of Llanthony in 1801, and was created the Marquess of Ormonde in the Peerage of Ireland in 1816; on his death that title became extinct and the earldoms passed to his brother, for whom the title Marquess of Ormonde was created in the Peerage of Ireland in 1825.  That title became extinct in 1997, while the earldom became dormant.

An unrelated Earldom of Ormonde was twice created in the Peerage of Scotland.

Earls of Ormond; First creation (1328)
James Butler, 1st Earl of Ormond (–1338)
James Butler, 2nd Earl of Ormond (1331–1382)
James Butler, 3rd Earl of Ormond (1361–1405)
James Butler, 4th Earl of Ormond (1392–1452)
James Butler, 5th Earl of Ormond and 1st Earl of Wiltshire (1420–1461)
John Butler, 6th Earl of Ormond (1422–1478)
Thomas Butler, 7th Earl of Ormond (–1515)

Earls of Ormond; Second creation (1529)
Thomas Boleyn, 1st Earl of Wiltshire and 1st Earl of Ormond (1477–1539)

Earls of Ormond; First creation (Reversed) / Third creation (1538)
Piers Butler, 8th Earl of Ormond (1467–1539) (also 1st Earl of Ossory in 1528)
James Butler, 9th Earl of Ormond (1496–1546) (also 1st Viscount Thurles in 1536)
Thomas Butler, 10th Earl of Ormond (1532–1614). Distant cousin of Elizabeth I
James Butler, Viscount Thurles (born 1584)
Walter Butler, 11th Earl of Ormond (1569–1634)
Thomas Butler, Viscount Thurles (died 1619)
James Butler, 12th Earl of Ormonde (1610–1688) (created Duke of Ormonde in 1661)

Dukes of Ormonde (1661 Ireland and 1682 England)
James Butler, 1st Duke of Ormonde (1610–1688) 
Thomas Butler, Viscount Thurles (–1633)
Thomas Butler, 6th Earl of Ossory (1634–1680)
James Butler, 2nd Duke of Ormonde (1665–1745) (title forfeited in 1715, subsequently held to apply only to the English dukedom)
Charles Butler, 3rd Duke of Ormonde (1671–1758) (Irish title held de jure unbeknownst to the holder)

Earls of Ormonde; First and Third creation (1328, 1538; Reverted)
John Butler, 15th and 8th Earl of Ormonde (died 1766) (de jure)
Walter Butler, 16th Earl of Ormonde (1703–1783) (de jure)
John Butler, 17th Earl of Ormonde (1740–1795)
Walter Butler, 18th Earl of Ormonde (1770–1820) (created Marquess of Ormonde in 1816)

Marquesses of Ormonde (1816)
Walter Butler, 1st Marquess of Ormonde (1770–1820)

Earls of Ormonde; First and Third creation (1328, 1538; Reverted)
James Wandesford Butler, 19th and 12th Earl of Ormonde (1777–1838) (created Marquess of Ormonde in 1825)

Marquesses of Ormonde (1825)
James Wandesford Butler, 1st Marquess of Ormonde and 19th Earl of Ormonde (1777–1838)
John Butler, 2nd Marquess of Ormonde and 20th Earl of Ormonde (1808–1854)
James Edward Butler, 3rd Marquess of Ormonde and 21st Earl of Ormonde (1844–1919)
Arthur Butler, 4th Marquess of Ormonde and 22nd Earl of Ormonde (1849–1943)
George Butler, 5th Marquess of Ormonde and 23rd Earl of Ormonde (1890–1949)
James Anthony Butler, Viscount Thurles (1916–1940)
Arthur Butler, 6th Marquess of Ormonde and 24th Earl of Ormonde (1893–1971)
Charles Butler, 7th Marquess of Ormonde and 25th Earl of Ormonde (1899–1997); earldoms dormant in 1997; marquessate extinct.

The 3rd Marquess of Ormonde is recorded as having written to the then Prime Minister of the United Kingdom, Benjamin Disraeli, regarding the restoration of the Dukedom of Ormonde in October 1868. Lord Ormonde claimed that his grandfather, James Butler, 1st Marquess of Ormonde (then 19th Earl of Ormond) had been advised by Lord Liverpool to apply for the restoration of the Dukedom, and that Lord Liverpool had advised him that in order to achieve this, he would first need to apply to be elevated from the rank of Earl to Marquess. An application was duly made, and James, 19th Earl of Ormond was granted the title Marquess of Ormonde. The 3rd Marquess believed that Lord Liverpool's loss of the Office of Prime Minister in 1827 frustrated this plan, and the 1st Marquess took no further action towards applying for the restoration of the Dukedom. The 3rd Marquess also alleged in his letter to Prime Minister Disraeli that his father, John Butler, 2nd Marquess of Ormonde had resolved not to pursue the restoration of the Dukedom of Ormonde unless another peer was also elevated to a Dukedom during his lifetime. Disraeli responded to the 3rd Marquess' letter on 27 October 1868, and expressed his sympathy with Lord Ormonde's desire to restore "the title of an illustrious ancestor". However, in his letter, Disraeli implied that the political climate of the time did not render the creation, or restoration, of the Dukedom of Ormonde to be appropriate, noting that "the condition of the party [the Conversation Party] is now critical,".

Earls of Ormonde and Ossory (1328/1538; Reverted)
The presumed successors of the 7th marquess in the Earldoms of Ormonde and Ossory have been the 17th and 18th Viscounts Mountgarret, descending in the male line from a younger son of the 8th Earl; however, no claim from the 17th or 18th viscount was submitted to the Monarch.

See also
 Irish nobility
 Butler dynasty

Notes

References
 
Attribution:

External links

Extinct earldoms in the Peerage of Ireland
Earl
Ormond
1528 establishments in Ireland
1661 establishments in Ireland
1682 establishments in England
Noble titles created in 1328
Noble titles created in 1529
Noble titles created in 1538
Dormant earldoms in the Peerage of Ireland
Earls of Ormond (Ireland)